Dance Dance Dance is a British talent show that aired on ITV from 8 January 2017 to 12 February 2017. It was presented by Alesha Dixon and Will Best and judged by Ashley Banjo, Tina Landon, and Timor Steffens.

Celebrities

Scoring chart

Green scores indicate the highest score of the week.
Red scores indicate the lowest score of the week.
 indicates the couple eliminated that week
 indicates the winning couple
 indicates the runner-up couple
 indicates the third-place couple

Average chart

Results summary
 Couple received the highest score from the judges
 Couple who received the lowest score from the judges and was eliminated
 Couple received the lowest score from the judges (no elimination)

Score summary
The "Order" columns lists the order of appearance each act made for every episode.

Week 1 (8 January)

Week 2 (15 January)

Week 3 (22 January)
One couple will be eliminated during each show from this point.

Week 4 (29 January)

Week 5: Semi-final (5 February)

Week 6: Final (12 February)

Ratings
Official ratings are taken from BARB. The figures for Episode 5 are not available as they are outside the Top 30 rated programmes for the week.

International versions
The Dutch format has already been sold to broadcasters in China, Germany, Italy, Poland, Saudi Arabia, Thailand and the UK.

See also
Dance on television

References

External links

2017 British television series debuts
2017 British television series endings
Dance competition television shows
English-language television shows
ITV game shows
Talent shows
Television series by ITV Studios